She & Him is an American musical duo consisting of members Zooey Deschanel and M. Ward. They have recorded songs for six studio albums and an extended play (EP), as well as various other releases. The two formed the band after working on their rendition of Richard and Linda Thompson's "When I Get to the Border", which was included on the soundtrack of Martin Hynes's 2007 film The Go-Getter and was used during its closing credits. Described as "a collection of vintage-sounding country-tinged songs", their debut album Volume One was released under indie label Merge Records in 2008. Deschanel wrote all of the album's original tracks, except "Sweet Darlin'", which she co-wrote with Jason Schwartzman.

In 2009, they recorded two songs for M. Ward's sixth studio album Hold Time and contributed a cover version of The Smiths' "Please, Please, Please, Let Me Get What I Want" to the (500) Days of Summer soundtrack. Deschanel penned eleven tracks for their followed-up release Volume Two (2010), where her lyrics touch on themes of romance and self-appreciation. The following year saw both artists performed three songs for the animated musical film Winnie the Pooh, including the theme song and an original composition named "So Long". For the latter work, Deschanel received a Grammy nomination for Best Song Written for Visual Media at its 54th ceremony. The duo's first Christmas album A Very She & Him Christmas was released in 2011, in which they recorded twelve cover versions of Christmas standards over the course of six days.

In 2012, M. Ward featured Deschanel on "Me and My Shadow" and "Sweetheart" from his album A Wasteland Companion. The two's fourth studio album, Volume 3 (2013) features more "disco grooves [and] string arrangements" than their previous works. The "bleached-out-in-the-sun pop record" included three covers and eleven tracks written by Deschanel—four of which later appeared on the duo's digital-only EP The Capitol Studios Session the same year. After signing with Columbia Records, She & Him started working on their major-label debut Classics (2014) with thirteen covers of classic tracks, recorded live and accompanied by a 20-piece orchestra, in which M. Ward helped with strings arrangement. Their second Christmas release, Christmas Party contains twelve holiday-themed tracks, was released in 2016.

She & Him was also involved in a number of side-projects. In 2010, they covered The Band's "Shape I'm In" and "Fools Rush In" exclusively for the Levi's "Shape What's to Come" and "Pioneer Sessions" campaigns, respectively. That same year, they performed "Earth" on Chickens in Love: An Album to Benefit 826LA, a collaborative project with 826LA which features songs written by students ages seven to thirteen. They later contributed their renditions of The Crickets' "Oh Boy" for the 2011 Buddy Holly tribute album, Rave On Buddy Holly and Roger Miller's "King of the Road" for the charity release Sweet Relief III: Pennies from Heaven (2013). In 2015, She & Him collaborated with musician Brian Wilson on the track "On The Island" from his eleventh studio album No Pier Pressure.

Songs

Notes

References

External links
 She & Him discography on the official website

She and Him